Slowcoaster is a Canadian indie rock band from Sydney, Nova Scotia. The band's sound is  rock-based, with strong influences of reggae, ska, folk and jazz.

History
Slowcoaster was formed in November 1999 by guitarist Steven MacDougall, drummer Devon Strang, and bassist Mike LeLievre. To promote themselves, they founded their own management company, House of Rock, which has since become influential in promoting a number of acts from Cape Breton Island.  The band performed locally and toured the Maritimes, releasing two EPs, Jody's Garden and Volume II. Slowcoaster added percussionist Darren Gallop to the lineup in 2002 and released Leaves, with Accidents & Excuses following in 2003.

The band began touring nationally and their debut album, Where Are They Going? was released in 2004. Steven MacDougall's song "Spanish Bay" placed second in the 16th Annual National Songwriting Competition the same year. A video for the single "Patio" was released and saw national play on MuchMusic. Drummer Devon Strang left the band around this time, with longtime collaborator Brian Talbot replacing him.

Slowcoaster came to the forefront of the Maritime live music scene in 2005 and 2006, touring frequently and headlining at Nova Scotia's Evolve Festival and Stan Rogers Folk Festival, New Brunswick's Sunseekers ball music festival, the Canada Day Countdown and Harvest Jazz & Blues Festival, and Prince Edward Island's Shoreline Festival.

They won Music Nova Scotia's Alternative Group of the Year award in 2005, and an ECMA award for Alternative Recording of the Year in 2006.

In 2007 the band released Future Radio. A video for the single "Leave" was released in early 2008. They followed up in 2010 with the album The Darkest of Discos, again winning the ECMA for Alternative Recording of the Year in 2011.

Their last full-length album, The Girls Downtown, was released in 2013. They have since released a few further singles independently on their Bandcamp page, most recently "Haunt You" in 2020.

Discography

Albums
Where Are They Going? – 2004
Future Radio – 2007
The Darkest of Discos – 2010
The Girls Downtown – 2013

EPs
Jody's Garden – 2000
Volume II – 2001
Leaves – 2002
Accidents & Excuses – 2003

References

External links
Slowcoaster

Canadian alternative rock groups
Canadian indie rock groups
Musical groups from Nova Scotia
Musical groups established in 1999
1999 establishments in Nova Scotia